Surfside Beach, also known locally as Surfside, is a city in Brazoria County, Texas, United States, that is situated on Follet's Island by the Gulf of Mexico near the city of Freeport. The population was 482 at the 2010 census. The city has claimed the "Cradle of Texas Liberty" title due to the fact that the Treaty of Velasco which ended hostilities between Texas and Mexico was signed at Fort Velasco, which was located near the city's current City Hall.

Former Congressman Ron Paul maintains a home in Surfside.

Geography

It is bordered to the southeast by the Gulf of Mexico and to the southwest by the entrance to Freeport Harbor, across which is the village of Quintana. The Intracoastal Waterway runs through the northwest part of the city, forming the northwest boundary in some places. The Bluewater Highway runs the length of Surfside Beach and continues northeast on Follet's Island  to San Luis Pass and the bridge onto Galveston Island. Texas State Highway 332 begins in Surfside Beach and leads northwest past Freeport  to Lake Jackson.

Demographics

As of the 2020 United States census, there were 640 people, 327 households,and 156 families residing in the city.
 
As of the census of 2010, 482 people, 259 households, and 113 families resided in the city. The population density was 427.7 people per square mile (165.5/km). There were 879 housing units at an average density of 287/sq mi (110.9/km). The racial makeup of the city was 93.8% White, 1.7% African American, 1.0% Native American, 1.0% Asian, 0.8% some other race, and 0.8% from two or more races. Hispanics or Latinos of any race were 6.6% of the population.

Of the 259 households, 15.4% had children under the age of 18 living with them, 33.2% were headed by married couples living together, 7.3% had a female householder with no husband present, and 56.4% were not families. About 42.5% of all households were made up of individuals, and 10.8% were someone living alone who was 65 years of age or older. The average household size was 1.86, and the average family size was 2.50.

In the city, the population was distributed as 10.6% under the age of 18, 6.5% from 18 to 24, 17.6% from 25 to 44, 48.9% from 45 to 64, and 16.2% who were 65 years of age or older. The median age was 50.9 years. For every 100 females, there were 119.1 males. For every 100 females age 18 and over, there were 122.2 males.

For the period 2008–2012, the estimated median annual income for a household in the city was $42,656, and for a family was $62,917. Male full-time workers had a median income of $42,692 versus $27,132 for females. The per capita income for the city was $26,328. The population sample was too small for poverty figures to be calculated.

Education

The city is served by Brazosport Independent School District (BISD).
 Freeport Elementary School (Pre-Kindergarten to grade 1)
 Velasco Elementary School (grades 2–4)
 Lanier Middle School (5–6)
 Freeport Intermediate School (7–8)
 Brazosport High School (9–12)

It was previously zoned to O.A. Fleming Elementary School (Pre-K–1), and Jane Long Elementary School (grades 2–4). Jane Long was scheduled to close in 2017, with Fleming taking grades K–1 and Velasco Elementary taking over grades 2–4. Fleming was scheduled to close when the new Freeport Elementary School opened in 2018.

The city is also served by Brazosport College. The Texas Legislature designated the Brazosport ISD as in the Brazosport College zone.

The city is served by the Brazoria County Library System.

Gallery

Notes

References

External links

 
 Village of Surfside Beach city government official website

Cities in Brazoria County, Texas
Cities in Texas
Greater Houston
Ron Paul
Populated coastal places in Texas